The 1922 Tasmanian state election was held on 10 June 1922 in the Australian state of Tasmania to elect 30 members of the Tasmanian House of Assembly. The election used the Hare-Clark proportional representation system — six members were elected from each of five electorates.

The incumbent Premier of Tasmania was Walter Lee of the Nationalist Party. The Labor Party was led by Joseph Lyons. Before the election, a new party had emerged, the Country Party, a conservative party aiming to represent farmers and rural interests. In Tasmania, the new party was led by Ernest Blyth.

At the election, the Nationalist Party lost four seats and Labor lost one seat. The Country Party won 5 seats and the balance of power. Despite surviving a no-confidence vote, Lee resigned and recommended that the Governor of Tasmania send for Blyth. Blyth organised a meeting between the Nationalist and Country parties, and they agreed to form Tasmania's first coalition government with John Hayes as Premier.

In this election, women were first eligible to stand for the House of Assembly. There were three women candidates standing, including Alicia O'Shea Petersen, all of whom stood as Independents and all of whom were unsuccessful.

Results

|}

Distribution of votes

Primary vote by division

Distribution of seats

See also
 Members of the Tasmanian House of Assembly, 1922–1925
 Candidates of the 1922 Tasmanian state election

References

External links
Assembly Election Results, 1922, Parliament of Tasmania.
Report on General Election, 1922, Tasmanian Electoral Commission, 7 September 1922.

Elections in Tasmania
1922 elections in Australia
1920s in Tasmania
June 1922 events